Oscar's Book Prize is a British children's book prize awarded annually to a book for pre-school age children, which was first published in the UK during the previous calendar year. The £5,000 prize is supported by the London Evening Standard and sponsored by Amazon and the National Literacy Trust, its patron is Princess Beatrice. Actor Gillian Anderson was one of the judges for the 2015 prize. In 2021, the prize money was raised to £10,000.

The prize was founded in 2014 by James Ashton and Viveka Alvestrand in memory of their three-year-old son Oscar Ashton who died unexpectedly in 2012. It aims to celebrate a child's love for magical stories and to reward the creativity of early-years literature and to highlight the importance of reading with children.

2014

The 2014 prize was awarded to Benji Davies for The Storm Whale.

Shortlisted Books List

2015

The 2015 prize was awarded to Steve Antony for The Queen's Hat.

Shortlisted Books List

2016

The 2016 prize was awarded to Gemma Merino for The Cow Who Climbed a Tree.

Shortlisted Books List

2017

The 2017 prize was awarded to Rachel Bright and Jim Field for The Koala Who Could.

Shortlisted Books List

2018

The 2018 prize was awarded to John Dougherty and Laura Hughes for There's a Pig Up My Nose.

Shortlisted Books List

2019

The 2019 prize was awarded to Ed Vere for How to be a Lion.

Shortlisted Books List

2020

The 2020 prize was awarded to Benji Davies for Tad.

Shortlisted Books List

2021

The 2021 prize was awarded to Lu Fraser and illustrator Kate Hindley for The Littlest Yak.

Shortlisted Books List

References

External links
 Oscar's Book Prize

Picture book awards
Children's literary awards
British children's literary awards
Awards established in 2014